Aberdeen Town House is a municipal facility in Castle Street, Aberdeen, Scotland. The town house, which is the headquarters of Aberdeen City Council, is a Category A listed building.

History

After rapid population growth in the first half of the 19th century, civic leaders decided that the early 17th-century tolbooth and the early 19th-century courthouse, which had been built adjacent to the tolbooth, were inadequate for their needs. They decided to demolish the old courthouse and to incorporate the remaining part of the tolbooth into a new structure.

The new building was designed by Peddie and Kinnear in the Scottish baronial style and was completed in 1874. The design involved an asymmetrical frontage with fifteen bays along Castle Street; the central section of five bays featured segmental-arched arcading on the ground floor and double-height segmental-arched windows on the second and third floors; the western section incorporated a five-stage clock tower with a spire while the eastern section incorporated the southern elevation of the old tolbooth. Internally, the principal room was the double-height council chamber. The new town house served as the headquarters of Aberdeen Town Council until 1895, when that body was replaced by Aberdeen Corporation.

King Edward VII and Queen Alexandra inspected a Guard of Honour from the 3rd Battalion of the Gordon Highlanders in front of the new town house on 27 September 1906.

The building remained the Corporation's headquarters until it was replaced by Aberdeen District Council under the wider Grampian Regional Council in May 1975. The foundation stone for an extension along Broad Street was laid by the Lord Provost, Robert Lennox, on 17 November 1975. The extension which was designed by the city architects, I. A. Ferguson and T. C. Watson, was built by Taylor Woodrow Construction. The complex then remained the Aberdeen District Council headquarters until the abolition of the Grampian Region led to the formation of Aberdeen City Council in April 1996.

The whole complex was extensively refurbished at a cost of £4 million between August 2014 and March 2017.

Works of art in the complex include a sculpture of Robert the Bruce by Anne Davidson showing the Scottish king in 14th-century armour carrying his shield and sword.

See also
 List of listed buildings in Aberdeen/4

References

Aberdeen
Government buildings completed in 1874
1874 establishments in Scotland
Category A listed buildings in Aberdeen
Listed government buildings in Scotland
Politics of Aberdeen
Clock towers in the United Kingdom